Greg Van Emburgh (born May 10, 1966) is a former professional tennis player from the United States.

Van Emburgh enjoyed most of his tennis success while playing doubles.  During his career he won 6 doubles titles.  He achieved a career-high doubles ranking of World No. 38 in 1993.

Career finals

Doubles (6 titles, 8 runner-ups)

External links
 
 

American male tennis players
American people of Dutch descent
Kentucky Wildcats men's tennis players
Sportspeople from New York City
Tennis people from New York (state)
Universiade medalists in tennis
Living people
1966 births
Universiade bronze medalists for the United States
Medalists at the 1987 Summer Universiade
Medalists at the 1991 Summer Universiade
Medalists at the 1993 Summer Universiade